J. Arthur "Dutch" Strauss (January 7, 1897 – August 10, 1969) was an American football player.  An Oklahoma native, he played college football at Phillips and professional football as a fullback for the Toledo Maroons (1923) and Kansas City Blues (1924) in the National Football League (NFL). He appeared in 13 NFL games, 10 as a starter, during the 1923 and 1924 seasons.

References

1897 births
1969 deaths
Toledo Maroons players
Kansas City Blues (NFL) players
Phillips Haymakers football players